Clarence Kparghai (born 13 May 1985 in Monrovia, Liberia) is a Liberian-born Swiss professional ice hockey defenceman who is currently an unrestricted free agent. He was most recently contracted with HC Lugano in the National League (NL). He has previously played for SC Langenthal, EHC Chur, HC Thurgau, EHC Olten, HC Davos and EHC Biel.

Playing career
Kparghai made his professional debut with SC Langenthal in the Swiss League (SL) during the 2004-05 SL season. He then made his National League (NL) debut during the 2005-06 NL season with HC Davos, playing 24 games that season.

Kparghai officially joined EHC Biel for the 2008-09 NL season and eventually played five years with the team, establishing himself as a National League player.

On 26 November 2012, Kparghai agreed to a three-year contract with HC Lugano for the 2013-14 NL season.

During the 2012–13 season, Kparghai was fined CHF 1,000 for biting SC Bern's John Tavares on 22 December 2012.

On 5 November 2015, Kparghai was signed to a three-year contract extension by Lugano. During the 2016 NL final against SC Bern, Kparghai tore his ACL, ending his season. He underwent surgery in the following days and once again in September because of complications, forcing him to sit out the entire 2016-17 NL season. He was able to resume hockey activities in July 2017.

Career statistics

Regular season and playoffs

International

References

External links

1985 births
Living people
Black ice hockey players
ECH Chur players
EHC Biel players
EHC Olten players
HC Davos players
EHC Kloten players
Liberian ice hockey players
SC Langenthal players
HC Lugano players
Sportspeople from Monrovia
Swiss ice hockey defencemen
Swiss people of Liberian descent
Sportspeople of Liberian descent
HCB Ticino Rockets players
HC Thurgau players